Francisco Silva was a Portuguese footballer who played as a defender. He was part of Portugal's squad for the 1928 Summer Olympics, but he did not play in any matches.

References

External links 
 
 

Year of birth missing
Year of death missing
Portuguese footballers
Association football defenders
Vitória F.C. players
Portugal international footballers